Typhlocypris is a genus of ostracods, which are a small, bivalved crustaceans. It contains the following species:
Typhlocypris pescei Karanovic, 2005
Typhlocypris regisnikolai (Karanovic & Petkovski, 1999)
Typhlocypris skadari Karanovic, 2005

References

Podocopida genera
Candonidae